Juan Carlos Machín Dikombo (born 6 July 1967), referred as Juan Carlos Ecomba, is a retired Equatoguinean football striker (right winger). Currently, he serves as referee for Benjamin federated matches in Catalonia.

Due to the civil wars in his natal country, he went into exile in Argentina, where he arrived in 1979. In this South American country, he played for Nueva Chicago, Deportivo Riestra, JJ Urquiza, Chacarita Juniors and Lugano.

Personal life
According to an official gazette from Buenos Aires City Hall that dates back to 29 August 2000, Ecomba has acquired the Argentine nationality. He left Argentina in 2003 and now resides in Barcelona, Spain.

References

External links
 Juan Carlos Ecomba at Base de Datos del Fútbol Argentino 
 

1967 births
Living people
Equatoguinean footballers
Association football forwards
Nueva Chicago footballers
Chacarita Juniors footballers
Equatoguinean expatriate footballers
Equatoguinean expatriate sportspeople in Argentina
Expatriate footballers in Argentina
Naturalized citizens of Argentina
Equatoguinean football referees
Equatoguinean expatriate sportspeople in Spain